Suseni is a commune in Argeș County, Muntenia, Romania. It is composed of ten villages: Burdești, Cerșani, Chirițești, Gălășești, Odăeni, Pădureni, Strâmbeni, Suseni, Ștefănești and Țuțulești.

References

Communes in Argeș County
Localities in Muntenia